Christopher J. Miller was an English academic, professor and scholar. He served as the third English headmaster of The Doon School, India from 1966 till 1970 and the last English one before the appointment of Matthew Raggett in 2016. He had an MA from University of Cambridge. During his tenure at Doon, his protégé included: Vikram Seth, Karan Thapar, Amitav Ghosh, Ramchandra Guha.

References

Notes

Bibliography 
 Chhota Hazri Days: A Dosco's Yatra by Sanjiv Bathla, Rupa & Co., 2010 .

For Hills To Climb by Gurdial Singh and Nalni Dhar, The Doon School Old Boys' Society, 2001.
An Indian Englishman by Jack Gibson, Lulu Press, 2008, 
Doon, The Story of a School, IPSS (1985) edited by Sumer Singh, published by the Indian Public Schools Society 1985.
 Constructing Post-Colonial India: National Character and the Doon School by Sanjay Srivastva, published by Routledge 1998 .

1916 births
Headmasters of The Doon School
Year of death missing
British expatriates in India